Events from the year 1935 in Italy

Events
 Il Liberatore, Italian language underground publication is founded.

Establishments 

 A.S.D. Roccella
 Aeronautica Umbra
 Azienda Italiana Petroli Albanesi
 Brondi
 Farmitalia
 Frejus (cycling team)
 Intrepido
 Istituto Marangoni
 Velodromo Vigorelli

Births 
9 January – Manlio De Angelis, actor (d. 2017)
11 January - Giampiero Cotti Cometti, geographer (d. 2009)
13 January - Mauro Forghieri, mechanical engineer (d. 2022)
19 January - Pupetta Maresca, figure in the Camorra (d. 2021)
31 January - Lorenzo Calafiore, wrestler (d. 2011)
27 February - Mirella Freni, operatic soprano (d. 2020)
30 March – Giuseppe Frigo, judge (d. 2019)  
22 April - Fiorenza Cossotto, operatic mezzo-soprano
26 June
 Carlo Facetti, racing driver
 Sandro Riminucci, basketball player
28 June – Nicola Tempesta, judoka
30 June – Valentino Gasparella, track cyclist
12 October - Luciano Pavarotti, operatic tenor (d. 2007)
28 October – Giancarlo Ghirardi, physicist (d. 2018)
22 December – Pippo Caruso, composer, conductor and music arranger (d. 2018)

Deaths
5 January – Pietro Bonilli, Roman Catholic priest and blessed (b. 1841)
17 May – Antonia Mesina, Roman Catholic laywoman, martyr and blessed (b. 1919)
7 August – Luigi Razza, journalist and fascist politician (b. 1892)
3 December – Antonino Calcagnadoro, painter (b. 1876)

References